Marco Antonio González Valdez (born 24 October 1972) is a Mexican politician affiliated with the MORENA. He currently serves as Deputy of the LXII Legislature of the Mexican Congress representing Nuevo León.

Local Deputy District 23 which includes the municipalities of Cadereyta and Santiago.

Study the career of International Trade at ITESM, as with a Certificate of Special Studies in Administration and Management from Harvard University, earned two Masters of the School of Economics and Political Science in London, the first in Social Policy and Planning in Countries Developing and second in Public Administration and Public Policy. He graduated Doctor of Regional Development of the University of Oxford.

He worked as a consultant at the World Bank in Washington D.C. and the Regional Office of the Food and Agriculture Organization of the United Nations (FAO), where he contributed to the Institutional Reforms in the Rural Sector, Non-Agricultural Rural Jobs, Policies to Combat Poverty and Land Regularization.

On his return to Nuevo León in 2003, he joined the Delegation of SEDESOL as State Coordinator Microregions, in January 2004. He joined the state administration in the position of Director of the General Unit of Planning, Evaluation and Rural development for Agricultural development Corporation of Nuevo León.

Later in November 2004 he was appointed Director General of the Trust for the Development of South Nuevo León (FIDESUR) by the Governor, Lic. Natividad Gonzalez Paras, and then I went to live with his family to Galeana by I mean more than 2 years, where I met and experienced about the needs of the inhabitants of rural municipalities.

In October 2009 he was appointed Director General of the Corporation for Agricultural Development of Nuevo León, by the Governor, Lic. Rodrigo Medina de la Cruz and February 6, 2012 renounce voluntarily to this position to contend the Federal Council of the IX District of Nuevo León, winning the 1 July, by a wide margin.

In September 2012 I was sworn in as Federal Deputy CNCista by the IX District of Nuevo León.

Part of the LXII Legislature of the Chamber of Deputies, which has been recognized as one of the most productive Legislatures in the history of Mexico. They have made major changes to the country's welfare in education, energy, telecommunications, fiscal, financial, labor, electoral politics, among others.

He is currently Chairman of the Study Center for Sustainable Rural Development and Agrifood Sobernía (CEDRSSA), Secretary to the Committee on Water and Sanitation, Secretary of the Commission for Social Development.

As federal deputy managed to allocate directly over $350 million in social projects for municipalities in the state as sports units, pavimientaciones, pipelines, water networks, drainage, sewerage, power agricultural irrigation, electrification, public squares, among other.

As a State Officer and Deputy to Federal supported in the past six years these two communes: Cadereyta and Santiago.

Restaurateur Business is also present in Cadereyta and Santiago.

References

1972 births
Living people
Politicians from Nuevo León
Members of the Chamber of Deputies (Mexico) for Nuevo León
Institutional Revolutionary Party politicians
21st-century Mexican politicians
Deputies of the LXII Legislature of Mexico
Harvard Extension School alumni